Diverge is a 2016 American sci-fi film written, directed, co-produced and co-edited by James Morrison in his directing debut.

Plot
Chris Towne is a man living in a post-apocalyptic world, who is desperate to find a way to save his wife from death. After meeting a strange man, he is given the chance to save his wife and the entire human race.

Cast
 Ivan Sandomire as Chris Towne
 Jamie Jackson as Leader
 Andrew Sensenig as Jim Eldon
 Erin Cunningham as Anna Towne
 Chris Henry Coffey as Whitmore 
 Adam David Thompson as Brad
 Amber Davila as Susan

Reception
On review aggregator Rotten Tomatoes, the film has an approval rating of 100% based on 5 reviews, with an average rating of 7/10. Anton Bitel writing on Sight & Sound magazine included the film among the best shown on 2017 Sci-Fi-London. John Higgins from Starburst magazine gave the film 7 out of 10 stars and stated: "Sandomire is very good in the lead role and holds the film together. Overall though, the smartly-written script will have the potential for repeat viewings to try and concoct where and how things unfold at the conclusion. Like last year’s excellent Imitation Girl, Diverge has much more to offer than CGI-action and pyrotechnics. Christopher Llewellyn Reed from Hammer To Nail wrote: "At 85 minutes, Diverge never overstays its welcome, and proves, time and again (remember: time travel), that low-budget science fiction can more than deliver."

Diverge gathered awards and nominations at several festivals, including Lund International Fantastic Film Festival, Boston Science Fiction Film Festival and Julien Dubuque International Film Festival.

References

External links
 
 

2016 films
Films about viral outbreaks
2010s science fiction films
Films about time travel
2016 directorial debut films
American post-apocalyptic films
2010s English-language films